Trần Đình Hoàng (born 8 December 1991) is a Vietnamese footballer who plays as a right-back for V.League 1 club Sông Lam Nghệ An and the Vietnam national football team.

Honours
Sông Lam Nghệ An 
Vietnamese National Cup: 2017
Vietnamese Super Cup: Runner-up 2018

External links

References 

1991 births
Living people
Vietnamese footballers
Association football defenders
Song Lam Nghe An FC players
V.League 1 players
Vietnam international footballers
People from Nghệ An province